Pellow is both a surname and given name. It is particularly associated with Cornwall.  It may refer to:

David Naguib Pellow (born 1969), American sociologist
Dick Pellow (1931-2019), American businessman and politician
J. D. C. Pellow, one of the Georgian Poets
Kit Pellow (born 1973), American baseball player
Marti Pellow (born 1965), Scottish singer
Nicola Pellow, CERN employee and internet pioneer
Pellow van der Westhuizen (born 1984), South African rugby union player
Thomas Pellow (1704-?), Cornish author notable for the slave narrative titled, 'The History of the Long Captivity and Adventures of Thomas Pellow in South-Barbary'

References